The Auckland Baptist Tabernacle is a heritage-listed church located near the corner of Queen Street and Karangahape Road, at the edge of Auckland central business district in New Zealand.

History
The Auckland Baptist Tabernacle was formed by Richard Shalders and 14 others in 1855 in the then fledgling colonial town of Auckland. By the late 1860s, a sizeable chapel had been built on Wellesley Street and the church flourished. In 1881, Thomas Spurgeon, son of the famous C. H. Spurgeon, accepted the role of pastor and the church rapidly outgrew first the Wellesley Street Chapel, and then the Symonds Street Choral Hall.

A prominent site at the top of Queen Street was secured. Initially it was intended that the Church would face Karangahape Road but the plans were revised so it was actually constructed with the main façade on Queen Street. This meant the portico was visible from the harbour. Although one of the biggest buildings to be constructed in the city at the time, it took only one year to build from 1884 to 1885. As well as having very good acoustics its auditorium was also the largest room in the city, able to accommodate over 1500 people.

The building was opened to the wider community on May 12, 1885, where a special tithe was taken to cover the final £100, rendering the church debt free. Designed by a local architect Edmund Bell, the building was directly based on the Metropolitan Tabernacle in London and featured the same columned portico derived from the Pantheon in Rome.

Thomas Spurgeon's non-identical twin brother Charles was the pastor of the Greenwich Baptist Church. As Greenwich is renowned as centre of time keeping the congregation possibly felt it was appropriate to present the Auckland Tabernacle with a clock manufactured in Greenwich. This clock is still a feature of the auditorium.

One of the elders of the Baptist church who championed the construction of the Auckland Tabernacle was Charles Blomfield.  Charles Blomfield was a Sign Writer and interior decorator who operated from a shop adjacent to the Tabernacle, although he is mostly known for his landscape paintings, especially of the Pink and White Terraces. The neo-classical stencil work on the ceiling of the main auditorium was done by Charles and his brother Samuel.

References

External links
Photographs of the Auckland Baptist Tabernacle held in Auckland Libraries' heritage collections.

Baptist churches in New Zealand
Baptist Tabernacle
Churches completed in 1885
Buildings and structures in Auckland
Heritage New Zealand Category 1 historic places in the Auckland Region
Listed churches in New Zealand
1880s architecture in New Zealand
Basilica churches in New Zealand
Auckland CBD
Stone churches in New Zealand